Ingawa is a Local Government Area in Katsina State, Nigeria. Its headquarters are in the town of Ingawa.

It has an area of 892 km and a population of 169,753 at the 2006 census. And the current chairman of the local government is Alhaji Ibrahim Mamman and the Emir (Sarki) of the district is Alhaji Babangida Sule Abubakar Dambo Sarkin Fulani Dambo.

The postal code of the area is 823.

History
Ingawa became a Local Government in May, 1989. The chairman is the official Head of Local government. The inhabitants of the Local Government are predominantly Hausa and Fulani by tribe. Their main occupation is farming and animal rearing.

Moreover, On vehicle license plates, Ingawa is abbreviated as NGW.

The local government Education Authority Ingawa was established in 1989 after the creation of Ingawa Local Government out of defunct Kankia local government.

The following served as Education secretaries from 1999 to date.

1. Alhaji Tukur Saude - 1999 – 2002

2. Alhaji Yusuf Bara’u - 2002 - 2012

3. Alhaji Abdu Ibrahim Yandoma - 2012 - Date.

References

Local Government Areas in Katsina State